Armando Luís Barcellos da Silva (born February 6, 1966 in Niterói, Rio de Janeiro) is an athlete from Brazil, who competes in triathlon. Barcellos competed at the first Olympic triathlon at the 2000 Summer Olympics.  He ended up in thirty-ninth place, with a total time of 1:53:42.63.

References

1966 births
Living people
Brazilian male triathletes
Olympic triathletes of Brazil
Triathletes at the 1999 Pan American Games
Triathletes at the 2000 Summer Olympics
Pan American Games competitors for Brazil
20th-century Brazilian people
21st-century Brazilian people